Toufic Barbir was a Lebanese footballer who played as an midfielder for DPHB and the Lebanon national team. Barbir took part in Lebanon's first international match against Mandatory Palestine in 1940.

References

External links
 

Year of birth missing
Year of death missing
Association football midfielders
Lebanese footballers
Lebanese Premier League players
AS DPHB players
Lebanon international footballers